Shatsk (Shatsk) is an urban-type settlement in Volyn Oblast, Kovel Raion, Ukraine, to the north-west of Kovel. Population: 

The village is situated in a picturesque area in the western part of Volyn Woodlands, surrounded by lakes, which are sometimes called Shatsky (Velyke Chorne, Svitiaz, Pulemetske, Luka, Liutsymer, Somynets, Karasynets, Ozertse).

In 2017, a postage stamp featuring the coat of arms of Shatsk was released by Ukrposhta.

History

In Ukrainian sources, the town located in this area is mentioned twice, in 1255 and in 1287. In Polish sources the town is first mentioned in 1410. During the Invasion of Poland it was the battlefield of the Battle of Szack between Polish forces of general Wilhelm Orlik-Rueckemann and the Soviet 4th Army.

The Jewish population of the village at the beginning of the German occupation was probably around 300. Germans arrived in the village on June 30, 1941.
In October 1941, the Jews of the city and surrounding villages were held captives in a ghetto. Shortly after, 319 Jews were shot by the Einsatzkommando and German police.

Until 2020 was an administrative centre of Shatsk Raion.

References

Urban-type settlements in Kovel Raion
Vladimir-Volynsky Uyezd
Wołyń Voivodeship (1921–1939)
Holocaust locations in Ukraine